Kasperski (also spelled Kaspersky) is a family name of East European origin. Formed by adding a Slavic adjective-forming suffix -ski (masc., also spelled -skii, -skiy; fem. -ska (Polish etc.), -skaya(Rus.)) to the Western men's personal name Kasper/Casper.

Kasperski or Kaspersky may refer to:

People

Kasperski
Lindy Kasperski, a former Canadian politician.
Wojciech Kasperski, a Polish screenwriter, film director and producer.

Kaspersky
Eugene Kaspersky, co-founder and head of Kaspersky Lab
Natalya Kaspersky, co-founder of Kaspersky Lab, Eugene Kaspersky's ex-wife
Ivan Kaspersky, the son of Eugene and Natalya Kaspersky
Kris Kaspersky (1976–2017), security researcher, unrelated to the founders of Kaspersky Lab

Businesses and business products
 Kaspersky Lab, a multinational computer security company, and its products
Kaspersky Anti-Virus, anti-malware software
Kaspersky Internet Security, an Internet security suite

Other
 Kaspersky Commonwealth Antarctic Expedition

Surnames from given names